Mickaël Partodikromo (born 2 February 1996) is a New Caledonian footballer who plays as a defensive midfielder for Karketu Dili.

Career
Partodikromo was born on 2 February 1996 in Nouméa to Bernard and Sabine. As a youth, he played for local side AS Mont-Dore. In 2010, while playing in an U16 tournament, he was scouted by the Auckland-based Asia Pacific Football Academy, whom offered him the chance to develop further. Partodikromo graduated the academy at the end of the 2012–13 season and was quickly offered a spot with Sheffield United's youth team. After a season at Bramall Lane, he moved to Team Wellington in the New Zealand Football Championship, where he quickly made the first team and was called up to their 2014–15 OFC Champions League squad.

Partodikromo was included as a substitute for the 2015 OFC Champions League Final, where Team Wellington were beaten 4–3 on penalties after a 1–1 draw to fellow NZFC side Auckland City. Shortly after the final, he signed a contract with former French champions Racing Club de Paris. After a season in France, Partodikromo signed with Rushall Olympic in the Northern Premier League Premier Division.

In June 2016, Partodikromo was invited to trial with Worcester City, before making his fifth move in five seasons, signing with fellow Northern Premier League Premier Division side Sutton Coldfield Town.

References

External links
 

Living people
1996 births
Association football defenders
New Caledonia international footballers
New Caledonian footballers
New Caledonian expatriate footballers
Expatriate footballers in England
Rushall Olympic F.C. players
Sutton Coldfield Town F.C. players